Ralph Cobbold (22 May 1906 – 1 September 1987) was an English cricketer. He played fourteen first-class matches for Cambridge University Cricket Club between 1926 and 1928.

See also
 List of Cambridge University Cricket Club players

References

External links
 

1906 births
1987 deaths
English cricketers
Cambridge University cricketers
People from Calne
Free Foresters cricketers